The 1999 Conference USA men's basketball tournament was held March 3–6 at the Birmingham–Jefferson Convention Complex in Birmingham, Alabama.

UNC Charlotte upset Louisville  in the championship game, 68–59, to clinch their first Conference USA men's tournament championship.

The 49ers, in turn, received an automatic bid to the 1999 NCAA tournament. They were joined in the tournament by fellow C-USA members UAB, Cincinnati, and Louisville, who all earned at-large bids.

Format
There were no new changes to the tournament format. The top four teams (in particular, the top two teams from the conference's two divisions: America and National) were given byes into the quarterfinal round while the remaining eight teams were placed into the first round. All seeds were determined by overall regular season conference records.

Bracket

References

Conference USA men's basketball tournament
Tournament
Conference USA men's basketball tournament
Conference USA men's basketball tournament